The great saphenous vein (GSV), or long saphenous vein) is a large, subcutaneous, superficial vein of the leg. It is the longest vein in the body, running along the length of the lower limb, returning blood from the foot, leg and thigh to the deep femoral vein at the femoral triangle.

Structure
The great saphenous vein originates from where the dorsal vein of the big toe (the hallux) merges with the dorsal venous arch of the foot. After passing in front of the medial malleolus (where it often can be visualized and palpated), it runs up the medial side of the leg. At the knee, it runs over the posterior border of the medial epicondyle of the femur bone. In the proximal anterior thigh  inferolateral to the pubic tubercle, the great saphenous vein dives down deep through the cribriform fascia of the saphenous opening to join the femoral vein. It forms an arch, the saphenous arch, to join the common femoral vein in the region of the femoral triangle at the sapheno-femoral junction.

Tributaries

Several veins join the great saphenous vein, but each of them is not present in every individual. Most of them join it near its junction with the common femoral vein (CFV), at various average distances from this junction:

At the ankle, the great saphenous vein receives branches from the sole of the foot through the medial marginal vein; in the lower leg it anastomoses freely with the small saphenous vein, communicates by perforator veins (Cockett perforators) with the anterior and posterior tibial veins and receives many cutaneous veins; near the knee it communicates with the popliteal vein by the Boyd perforator, in the thigh it communicates with the femoral vein by perforator veins (Dodd perforator) and receives numerous tributaries; those from the medial and posterior parts of the thigh frequently unite to form a large accessory saphenous vein which joins the main vein near the sapheno-femoral junction.

Near the fossa ovalis it is joined by the superficial epigastric, superficial circumflex iliac vein, and superficial external pudendal veins.

The thoracoepigastric vein runs along the lateral aspect of the trunk between the superficial epigastric vein below and the lateral thoracic vein above and establishes an important communication between the femoral vein and the axillary vein.

Clinical significance
Pathology of the great saphenous vein is relatively common, but in isolation typically not life-threatening.
 Varicose veins: The great saphenous vein, like other superficial veins, can become varicose; swollen, twisted and lengthened, and generally considered to be unsightly. Varicose veins are not life-threatening and various treatment options are available. However, when the diameter of the vein is too large for the valves within it to coapt completely, the resulting condition, chronic venous insufficiency, can result in skin color changes in the calf and ulcers that may persist for years if the vein is not ablated.
 Thrombophlebitis: The GSV can thrombose. This type of phlebitis of the GSV is usually not life-threatening in isolation; however, if the blood clot is located near the sapheno-femoral junction or near a perforator vein, a clot fragment can migrate to the deep venous system and to the pulmonary circulation. Also it can be associated with, or progress to a deep vein thrombosis which must be treated promptly. So a GSV thrombosis is investigated by ultrasonography to detect if these complications are present.

Use in cardiovascular procedures
The vein is often removed by cardiac surgeons and used for autotransplantation in coronary artery bypass operations, when arterial grafts are not available or many grafts are required, such as in a triple bypass or quadruple bypass.

The great saphenous vein is the conduit of choice for vascular surgeons,  when available, for performing peripheral arterial bypass operations [ see vascular bypass ]. The saphenous vein may undergo vein graft failure after engraftment, but still it has superior long-term patency compared to synthetic grafts (PTFE, PETE (Dacron)), human umbilical vein grafts or biosynthetic grafts [Omniflow].  Often, it is used in situ (in place), after tying off smaller tributaries and destruction of the venous valves with a device called valvulotome, e.g. LeMaitre's valvulotome.

Removal of the saphenous vein will not hinder normal circulation in the leg. The blood that previously flowed through the saphenous vein will change its course of travel. This is known as collateral circulation.

The saphenous nerve is a branch of the femoral nerve that runs with the great saphenous vein and can be damaged in surgery on the vein.

Use in emergency medicine
When emergency resuscitation with fluids is necessary, and standard intravenous access cannot be achieved due to venous collapse, saphenous vein cutdown may be utilized.

Etymology 
The terms "saphaina" (Greek, meaning "manifest", "to be clearly seen") and "safoon" (Hebrew, "שָׂפוּן" meaning "hidden/covered") as well as "safin" (Arabic, "صَافِن" meaning "deep/embedded") have been claimed as the origin for the word "saphenous".

Additional images

See also

 Coronary artery bypass grafting (CABG)
 Saphena varix
 Varicose veins

References

External links
Great saphenous vein - Stedman's medical dictionary.
 
 
 

Veins of the lower limb